Sanja Radosavljević (born 15 January 1994) is a Serbian handball player for RK Krim and the Serbian national team.

She competed at the 2015 World Women's Handball Championship in Denmark.

References

External links

1994 births
Living people
Serbian female handball players
Sportspeople from Pančevo
Expatriate handball players
Serbian expatriate sportspeople in Hungary
Universiade medalists in handball
Mediterranean Games medalists in handball
Mediterranean Games gold medalists for Serbia
Competitors at the 2013 Mediterranean Games
Universiade bronze medalists for Serbia
Medalists at the 2015 Summer Universiade